Cottbus or Chóśebuz is a university city and the second-largest city in the German state of Brandenburg after the state capital of Potsdam. With around 98,000 inhabitants, it is the most populous city in Lusatia. The city is located on the shores of Cottbus Eastern Lake (Chóśebuski pódzajtšny jazor), which will be Germany's largest artificial lake by surface area when flooding is completed.

Cottbus is considered the political and cultural center of the Lower Sorbian-speaking Sorbs (in Lower Lusatia also called the Wends), while the overall center of all Sorbs (Lower and Upper) is Bautzen. Cottbus is the largest officially bilingual city in Germany, and the signage is mostly in German and Lower Sorbian. The city is the seat of several Lower Sorbian institutions like the Lower Sorbian version of the Sorbian Broadcasting (Serbski rozgłos/Bramborske Serbske Radijo), the Lower Sorbian Gymnasium, and the Wendish Museum (Serbski muzej). The use of the Lower Sorbian language, however, is more widespread in the surrounding villages than in the city itself. Cottbus is a major railway junction with extensive sidings/depots.

In the 10th century, the Wends constructed the largest Slavic castle of Lower Lusatia, a gord, on a Spree island, and this former gord is considered the nucleus of the city. On it rises the massive 13th century Castle Tower (grodojski torm) with its blue clock.

Cottbus is the seat of the Brandenburg University of Technology (German: Brandenburgische Technische Universität Cottbus–Senftenberg, Lower Sorbian: Bramborska techniska uniwersita Chóśebuz–Zły Komorow). Due to this, the city has the official names Universitätsstadt Cottbus/Uniwersitne město Chóśebuz (University City Cottbus). Branitz Castle, built in 1770–71, in the southeast of the city, was a residence of the Prince of Pückler-Muskau. The prince who also created Muskau Park, designed the extensive Branitz Park on the shores of the Spree, with its two grass pyramids. Cottbus State Theater (Statne źiwadło Chóśebuz) is the only state theater in Brandenburg. The Wendish Quarter is a part of the city supposed to resemble the traditional Sorbian architectural style, constructed of prefabricated concrete slabs in East Germany between 1984 and 1989.

Spelling 
Until the beginning of the 20th century, the spelling of the city's name was disputed. In Berlin, the spelling "Kottbus" was preferred, and it is still used for the capital's  ("Cottbus Gate"), but locally the traditional spelling "Cottbus" (which defies standard German-language rules) was preferred, and it is now used in most circumstances. Because the official spelling used locally before the spelling reforms of 1996 had contravened even the standardized spelling rules already in place, the  stress their urgent recommendation that geographical names should respect the national spelling standards. A citizen of the city may be identified as either a "Cottbuser" or a "Cottbusser".

Names in different languages:

History 

The settlement was established in the tenth century, when Sorbs erected a castle on a sandy island in the River Spree. The first recorded mention of the town's name was in 1156. In the 13th century German settlers came to the town and thereafter lived side by side with the Sorbs.

In the Middle Ages Cottbus was known for wool, and the town's drapery was exported throughout Brandenburg, Bohemia and Saxony. It was part of the Margraviate of Lusatia and later Lower Lusatia, which was held by the House of Wettin until it became a Bohemian Crown Land in 1367.

In 1445 Cottbus was acquired by the Margraviate of Brandenburg from Bohemia. It was an exclave almost completely surrounded by Bohemian Lower Lusatia (with a short border with the Electorate of Saxony to the south-west). In 1635 Lower Lusatia was ceded by Bohemia to Saxony, thereby making Cottbus an enclave of Saxony. In 1701 Brandenburg-Prussia became the Kingdom of Prussia.

In 1807, following the War of the Fourth Coalition, Cottbus was ceded by Prussia to the Kingdom of Saxony by the Treaty of Tilsit, reuniting it with Lower Lusatia. Cottbus was returned to Prussia by the Congress of Vienna in 1815 after the Napoleonic wars. Lower Lusatia was also ceded to Prussia and both became part of the Prussian Province of Brandenburg (and ), where they remained until 1947.

In 1871 Prussia, and therefore Cottbus, became part of the German Empire. According to the Prussian census of 1905, the city of Cottbus had a population of 46,270, of which 97% were Germans, 2% were Sorbs and 1% were Poles.

In interwar Germany, the town was the site of a concentration camp for unwanted Jewish immigrants from Eastern Europe.

During World War II, a Nazi prison for women was operated in the city with multiple forced labour subcamps located both in the city and other places in the region. In the final weeks of the war, Cottbus was taken by the Red Army on 22 April 1945. In January 1946, Cottbus issued 34 semi-postal postage stamps to help finance rebuilding the city. From 1949 until German reunification in 1990, Cottbus was part of the German Democratic Republic (East Germany). From 1952 to 1990, Cottbus was the administrative seat of Bezirk Cottbus.

Boroughs

Demography

Culture and education 

Cottbus is the cultural centre of the Lower Sorbian minority. Many signs in the town are bilingual, and there is a Lower Sorbian-medium Gymnasium and a Sorbian Quarter, but Sorbian is rarely spoken on the streets.

Next to Cottbus is the famous Branitz Park, created by Prince Hermann von Pückler-Muskau after 1845. Schloss Branitz (Branitz Castle) was rebuilt by Gottfried Semper in a late Baroque style between 1846 and 1852, and the gardens Prince Hermann laid feature two pyramids. One of these, the Seepyramide, is in the middle of an artificial lake and serves as his mausoleum.

Cottbus is also home to the Brandenburg University of Technology (BTU) and the maths/science-oriented Max-Steenbeck-Gymnasium, named after the physicist Max Steenbeck.

Every year Cottbus hosts the East Europe International Film Festival.

Cottbus has a soccer team, Energie Cottbus, that plays in the Regionalliga Nordost as of the 2021–2022 season. Their home matches are played at the city's Stadion der Freundschaft.

Economy

Transportation

Cottbus is served by Cottbus Hauptbahnhof main railway station.

Two airports serve the city: Cottbus-Drewitz Airport (approximately 25 kilometres (16 mi) north-east of Cottbus), and Cottbus-Neuhausen Airport (approximately 10 km (6.2 miles) south-east of Cottbus).

Local public transport is served by trams and buses operated by Cottbusverkehr GmbH and DB Regio Bus Ost GmbH, both of which are members of the Verkehrsverbund Berlin-Brandenburg (VBB).

Power generation 
There are several lignite-fired power stations in the area around Cottbus (Lausitz) fed through local open pit mining. The biggest stations are "Schwarze Pumpe" (1600 MW), "Boxberg" (1900 MW) and "Jänschwalde" (3000 MW). Some of the open-pit mines have already been shut down with the former  being converted into an artificial lake with  surface area called Cottbuser Ostsee (Cottbus eastern lake).

Twin towns – sister cities

Cottbus is twinned with:

 Montreuil, France (1959)
 Grosseto, Italy (1967)
 Lipetsk, Russia (1974)
 Zielona Góra, Poland (1975)
 Targovishte, Bulgaria (1975)
 Košice, Slovakia (1978)
 Saarbrücken, Germany (1987)
 Gelsenkirchen, Germany (1995)
 Nuneaton and Bedworth, England, United Kingdom (1999)

Notable people

Janice Behrendt (born 1983), beauty queen and model
Carl Blechen (1798–1840), landscape painter
Kurt Demmler (1943–2009), songwriter; accused of sexual abuse, he hanged himself in his jail cell.
Rudi Fink (born 1958), amateur boxer and boxing coach
Gustav Theodor Fritsch (1838–1927), anatomist, anthropologist and physiologist
Marco Geisler (born 1974), rower
Robert Harting (born 1984), discus thrower
Otto Hugo Paul Grottkau (1846–1898), socialist and trade unionist and American journalist
Tony Martin (born 1985), cyclist
Jens Melzig (born 1965), footballer
Daniel Musiol (born 1983), cyclist
Reinhold Platz (1886–1966), aircraft designer and manufacturer at Fokker
Gabriele Reinsch (born 1963), world record holder discus throwing
Viktoria Schmidt-Linsenhoff (1944–2013), art historian and professor
Heiko Schwarz (born 1989), footballer

See also 
 Cottbus Air Base
 Klinge

References

External links 

 
  
 Homepage of Brandenburg Technical University
 

 
Towns in Brandenburg